Common chord may refer to:

 Common chord (geometry), the secant line that joins the intersection points of two curves
 Common chord (music), a chord shared by two musical keys
 The Common Chord, a 1947 short story collection by Frank O'Connor
 Common Chord, a 1993 album by David Grisman